Kallan D'Souza is a 2022 Indian Malayalam-language action comedy film directed by  Jithu K Jayan and starring Soubin Shahir, Dileesh Pothan, Surabhi Lakshmi and Hareesh Kanaran. The music was scored by Kailas Menon. The film is a spin-off to 2015 Malayalam film Charlie where Soubin Shahir reprises his role as Kallan D'Souza.

Cast 
 Soubin Shahir as Kallan D'Souza
 Dileesh Pothan as CI Manoj 
 Surabhi Lakshmi as Asha 
 Rony David as Muhammad Iqbal
 Hareesh Kanaran as Thief, D'Souza asst. 
 Vijayaraghavan as DYSP
 Sreejith Ravi as CPO
 Santhosh Keezhattoor as CPO
 Privin Vinish as Gunda

Reception 
A critic from The Times of India wrote that "While the premise of blurring the lines between traditional roles of good and bad is interesting, the film is hardly well developed". A critic from The Indian Express wrote that "There are no humour elements, memorable moments or engaging factors in Kallan D'Souza other than the curiosity to know whether Asha and her child get a relief from the hands of Manoj". On the contrary, a critic from Manorama Online wrote that "Kallan D'Souza is definitely an engaging watch". A critic from OTT Play wrote that "Kallan D'Souza is a comedy that lacks any real humour and gets lost in what they really wanted to do, with the two subplots". A critic from Behindwoods wrote that "Kallan D'Souza is a silent entertainer, wherein viewers will get their dose of entertainment without being subjected to mass-y dialogues or over-the-top dialogues".

References 

2020s Malayalam-language films
2022 films
Indian action comedy films